is the sequel to Space Harrier, developed and published by Sega. It was one of the original launch titles released for the Mega Drive in Japan and one of the six Sega Genesis launch titles in the U.S. It was also later released on the Wii's Virtual Console in December 2006, and on the Nintendo Switch Online + Expansion Pack in April 2022. Like Altered Beast, another launch title for the Mega Drive, Space Harrier II features digitized human voice recordings during gameplay, and is also an example of some of the Mega Drive's early sound, composed by Tokuhiko Uwabo (credited as "Bo"). A graphically enhanced version included with the Sega Genesis Mini 2 was released October 2022.

Plot
Harrier once again receives a call for help, this time from the 214th sector, light-years from his cruiser. Harrier travels there quickly with his "cosmic gate", and finds that Fantasy Land is once again being overrun by hostile forces. He resolves to once again save a world by fighting off the entire force himself.

Gameplay
Like the original, the game involves a superhuman hero who runs and flies towards a forever distant background on a checkerboard-styled ground. The player can hit any of the controller's buttons to cause the Space Harrier character to fire his large laser cannon (four shots at a time). There is also an option to turn on auto-fire in the game menu. As the playing field moves forward, enemies come from behind and from the far distance to attack the character, by either firing a projectile or trying to crash into him. The player must also dodge large objects in his path, some of which can be destroyed, such as trees, and others that cannot be, such as ionic columns and pylons. One hit from an enemy or a crash into these large objects will cause the player to lose a life; extra lives are awarded every certain number of points. Smaller objects, such as foliage, will only cause Harrier to trip; however, this leaves him vulnerable to attack for two seconds. If the player loses all lives, the game will be over.

There are a total of 12 stages, each with its own end boss. A stage usually consists of different landscapes (small objects vs. large objects), and can also move at different speeds (slow vs. fast). Some stages, such as Stuna Area, have a mid-level boss that can be easily defeated. Although the player can select any stage to start the game at, all twelve levels must be completed before moving on to the Final Chapter stage. There, the player must defeat all the main bosses over again, and then fight the Dark Harrier in order to complete the game.

Enemies move onto the screen in uniform clusters. A signal tone is played to alert the player that there is a non-stationary enemy now in the playing field. In many cases, the enemies move in a straight line along a predetermined, pseudo-three-dimensional path. Waves of enemies also often come in pairs: one group will come from the left in the distance or foreground, followed by the same type and same number of enemies coming in from the right. Due to the inability of the Mega Drive to scale sprites, enemy, landscape, and shadow sprites are pre-rendered at different sizes.

Reception

In 1989, ACE magazine listed Space Harrier II as one of the top three best games available for the Mega Drive at the time, along with Altered Beast and Thunder Force II.

References

External links
Official Virtual Console minisite 
Official Sega Ages 2500 Minisite 
Official PlayStation Minisite 
Official Nintendo Minisite 

1988 video games
Amiga games
Amstrad CPC games
Atari ST games
Commodore 64 games
Rail shooters
Sega-AM2 games
Sega Genesis games
Virtual Console games
ZX Spectrum games
MSX games
IOS games
Nintendo Switch Online games
Video games designed by Yu Suzuki
Video games developed in Japan
Video games scored by Matt Furniss
Video game sequels
Single-player video games

ja:スペースハリアー#続編・関連タイトル
sv:Space Harrier II